Sapphire is a superheroine appearing in media published by DC Comics. She first appeared in the Power Company back-up story in JLA #61 (February 2002), but her origin is told in Power Company: Sapphire #1 (March 2002). Sapphire was created by Kurt Busiek and Tom Grummett.

Fictional character biography
Candice "Candy" Jean Gennaro, is a sixteen-year-old runaway and street thief on the streets of San Diego, California, who stumbles onto the scene of a battle between the Lord Kobra and his green armored forces, and Lady Eve's black armored splinter faction of the Kobra organization. Candy ends up trapped inside a forcefield thrown up by Kobra to keep out early respondents from the Justice League.

Candy falls into Kobra's Sea Serpent submarine while running across the impromptu dockside battlefield. While crawling through the submarine's ductwork to find a way out, she overhears Lord Naga-Naga himself discussing the properties of the Serpent's Egg with two mutated Serpent Men and several human lackeys. The Serpent's Egg is a blue, gem-shaped alien artifact that fell to Earth centuries ago, it has psycho-interactive properties that would make for the perfect armor. Kobra had decided to steal the gem when he discovered that it was no longer dormant. Candy decides to see if she can use the Egg to help her escape and steals the Egg, and it bonds to her body forming a nearly impenetrable second skin which allows her to battle and escape Kobra's minions and the submarine, inadvertently thwarting Kobra's plan. Apparently the gem has lifebonded to Candy.

Fearful that Kobra and his forces will hunt her down, Candy decides to seek safety in numbers and heads for the headquarters of the newly-established Power Company. There she discovers members of the mercenary group known as the Strike Force on the roof planning to assault the company. The Strike Force plans to take Josiah Power hostage and steal transportation out of the city. Candy engages the Strike Force but is knocked unconscious after a short struggle, the mercenaries are later defeated by a transformed Josiah Power. Due to these events Candy joins the Power Company as an Associate, using the codename Sapphire. She remains with the team until the series finale in issue #18.

Terror Titans

Sapphire has recently appeared in the Terror Titans mini-series, as one of a number of brainwashed young heroes made to fight each other by The Dark Side Club.

Powers and abilities
Candy is physically bonded to a psycho-reactive alien gem called the Serpent's Egg. It appears to tap into her latent telekinetic abilities, allowing her to fly and manipulate its structure to form various constructs.

References

External links
DCU Guide: Sapphire
Cosmic Teams: Power Company Chronology

DC Comics female superheroes
DC Comics superheroes
DC Comics metahumans
DC Comics telekinetics
Fictional characters from San Diego
Characters created by Kurt Busiek